Francis Charles Needham, 3rd Earl of Kilmorey   (2 August 1842 – 28 July 1915), styled Viscount Newry from 1851 to 1880, was an Anglo-Irish peer and Conservative Member of Parliament.

Background and education
Kilmorey was the eldest son of Francis Needham, Viscount Newry, son of Francis Needham, 2nd Earl of Kilmorey. His mother was Anne Amelia Colville, daughter of General Sir Charles Colville. He attended Eton College and Christ Church, Oxford.

In 1862 (aged nineteen), Kilmorey proposed to give a ball; this was prohibited by the college authorities, chiefly by Charles Lutwidge Dodgson (better known as Lewis Carroll). The wife of Henry Liddell, the Dean of the college, had supported the ball; the Liddells' Irish residence was close to the Kilmorey seat of Mourne Park, and this favour to a family friend might have made social connections for her several daughters (including Alice). The ball and the resulting coldness between the Liddells and Carroll is mentioned in his diary as "Lord Newry's business". He graduated in 1864.

Political career
In 1874 he served as High Sheriff of Down and was then elected to the House of Commons for Newry in 1871, a seat he held until 1874. In 1880 he succeeded his grandfather as Earl of Kilmorey, but as this was an Irish peerage it did not entitle him to an automatic seat in the House of Lords. However, the following year Kilmorey was elected an Irish Representative Peer, and sat in the House of Lords until his death in 1915. In 1890 he was made a Knight of the Order of St Patrick.

Military career
As Viscount Newry, he was commissioned Cornet in the North Shropshire Yeomanry Cavalry in 1865, then promoted Captain in 1871, before the Cavalry were merged into the unified Shropshire Yeomanry regiment.  He continued in the latter, being promoted Major in 1883 and becoming Lieutenant-Colonel in command of the regiment in 1889.
He retired in 1896 and was made Honorary Colonel of the regiment.

After the accession of King Edward VII in 1901, Lord Kilmorey was appointed Aide-de-camp (Supernumerary) to His Majesty for the service of His Yeomanry Force. He also received the rank of colonel in the Yeomanry Force.

Personal life
Lord Kilmorey married in 1881 Ellen Constance Baldock, daughter of Edward Holmes Baldock (MP for Shrewsbury). She was a renowned beauty who caused a scandal by being bequeathed the 'Teck emeralds' among other jewels, from her lover, Prince Francis of Teck, brother of Queen Mary. She also reputedly had a liaison with Edward VII, a frequent visitor to the Kilmorey estates at Mourne Park, County Down.

Lord Kilmorey died in July 1915, aged 72, of pleurisy and pneumonia at his Mayfair townhouse at 5 Aldford Street. He was buried at Kilkeel, County Down.   He was succeeded in his titles by his eldest son Francis. Lady Kilmorey died in 1920.

References

External links

1842 births
1915 deaths
High Sheriffs of Down
Knights of St Patrick
Members of the Parliament of the United Kingdom for Newry (1801–1918)
UK MPs 1868–1874
Kilmorey, E3
Irish representative peers
Irish Conservative Party MPs
Shropshire Yeomanry officers
People educated at Eton College
Alumni of Christ Church, Oxford
Earls of Kilmorey